The 1990 All-Ireland Senior Club Camogie Championship for the leading clubs in the women's team field sport of camogie was won by Glen Rovers, who defeated St Paul’s from Kilkenny in the final, played at Nowlan Park.

Arrangements
The championship was organised on the traditional provincial system used in Gaelic Games since the 1880s, with Swatragh and Mullagh winning the championships of the other two provinces. Glen Rovers changes to the team included the retirement of Marie Ryan, the loss of Val Fitzpatrick, who had moved to Boston and the arrival of Cork inter-county players Linda Mellerick and Claire McCarthy and the emerging Denise Cronin. They won the Munster championship and swept aside Swatragh in the semi-final, in a match in which Swatragh failed to score and goalkeeper Mairéad McAtamney was Swatragh’s best player. Mullagh, whose average age is just 20, trailed by just a point into the final stages of the semi-final against St Paul’s thanks to a great performance by Alice Murphy. Timely goals by Angela and Ann Downey saw Paul’s through the gfinal.

The Final
Ger McCarthy scored 2–11 for Glen Rovers in the final and Linda Mellerick added 2–2 as they stopped St Paul’s bid for a ninth All Ireland club championship.

Final stages

References

External links
 Camogie Association

1990 in camogie
1990